The 2018 Texas Longhorns baseball team represented the University of Texas at Austin during the 2018 NCAA Division I baseball season. The Longhorns played their home games at UFCU Disch–Falk Field as a member of the Big 12 Conference. They were led by head coach David Pierce, in his second season at Texas.

The Longhorns claimed the Big 12 Conference regular season title, then swept the Austin Regional and won the Austin Super Regional to advance to the 2018 College World Series, extending their record for most appearances in Omaha to 36.  The Longhorns had not reached the ultimate event in college baseball since 2014.

Personnel

Roster

Coaches

Schedule and results

! style=""|Regular Season
|- valign="top" 

|-bgcolor=ccffcc
| Feb 16 || Louisiana* ||  || UFCU Disch–Falk Field • Austin, TX || W 3–0 || Kingham (1–0) || Burk (0–1) || Ridgeway (1) || 5,195 || 1–0 || 
|-bgcolor=ccffcc
| Feb 17 || Louisiana* ||  || UFCU Disch–Falk Field • Austin, TX || W 5–3 || Ridgeway (1–0) || Moore (0–1) || None || 5,330 || 2–0 || 
|-bgcolor=ffbbb
| Feb 18 || Louisiana* ||  || UFCU Disch–Falk Field • Austin, TX || L 1–2 || Batty (1–0) || McGuire (0–1) || Stoelke (1) || 4,740 || 2–1 || 
|-bgcolor=ccffcc
| Feb 21 || * ||  || UFCU Disch–Falk Field • Austin, TX || W 7–2 || Elder (1–0) || Jones (0–1) || None || 3,950 || 3–1 || 
|-bgcolor=ffbbb
| Feb 23 || at LSU* || || Alex Box Stadium • Baton Rouge, LA || L 4–13 || Hess (1–1) || Kingham (1–1) || None || 11,102 || 3–2 || 
|-bgcolor=ffbbb
| Feb 24 || at LSU* ||  || Alex Box Stadium • Baton Rouge, LA || L 10–5 || Beck (1–0) || Elder (1–1) || None || 12,038 || 3–3 || 
|-bgcolor=ccffcc
| Feb 25 || at LSU* ||  || Alex Box Stadium • Baton Rouge, LA || W 11–1 || Henley (1–0) || Peterson (0–2) || None || 10,762 || 4–3 || 
|-bgcolor=ccffcc
| Feb 27 || * ||  || UFCU Disch–Falk Field • Austin, TX || W 2–0 || O'Donnell (1–0) || Rodriguez (0–1) || Kingham (1) || 4,284 || 5–3 || 
|-

|-bgcolor=ffbbb
| Mar 2 || * ||  || UFCU Disch–Falk Field • Austin, TX || L 2–6 || Fordon (1–0) || Shugart (0–1) || Bordignon (1) || 5,082 || 5–4 || 
|-bgcolor=ccffcc
| Mar 3 || Northwestern* ||  || UFCU Disch–Falk Field • Austin, TX || W 10–7 || Kingham (2–1) || Christie (0–2) || Ridgeway (2) ||  || 6–4 || 
|-bgcolor=ccffcc
| Mar 3 || Northwestern* ||  || UFCU Disch–Falk Field • Austin, TX || W 16–3 || Henley (2–0) || Bader (1–2) || None || 6,018 || 7–4 || 
|-bgcolor=ccffcc
| Mar 4 || Northwestern* ||  || UFCU Disch–Falk Field • Austin, TX || W 12–1 || Elder (2–0) || Katz (0–2) || None || 4,395 || 8–4 || 
|-bgcolor=ffbbb
| Mar 8 || * ||  || UFCU Disch–Falk Field • Austin, TX || W 8–6 || Elder (3–1) || Weiermiller (3–1) || Shugart (1) || 4,664 || 9–4 || 
|-bgcolor=ffbbb
| Mar 9 || Stanford* ||  || UFCU Disch–Falk Field • Austin, TX || L 1–7 || Bubic (3–0) || Kingham (2–2) || None || 4,997 || 9–5 || 
|-bgcolor=ffbbb
| Mar 10 || Stanford* ||  || UFCU Disch–Falk Field • Austin, TX || L 9–3 || Weiermiller (4–1) || Henley (2–1) || Little (6) || 6,349 || 9–6 || 
|-bgcolor=ffbbb
| Mar 11 || Stanford* ||  || UFCU Disch–Falk Field • Austin, TX || L 1–11 || Beck (2–0) || Shugart (0–2) || None ||  || 9–7 || 
|-bgcolor=ffbbb
| Mar 13 || at Arkansas* ||  || Baum Stadium • Fayetteville, AR || L 4–13 || Murphy (2–0) || Ridgeway (1–1) || Kostyshock (1) || 8,051 || 9–8 || 
|-bgcolor=ffbbb
| Mar 14 || at Arkansas* ||  || Baum Stadium • Fayetteville, AR || L 5–7 || Bolden (2–0) || O'Donnell (1–1) || Cronin (2) || 8,007 || 9–9 || 
|-bgcolor=ccffcc
| Mar 16 ||  ||  || UFCU Disch–Falk Field • Austin, TX || W 14–4 || Kingham (3–2) || Davis (0–1) || None || 4,965 || 10–9 || 1–0
|-bgcolor=ccffcc
| Mar 17 || Kansas ||  || UFCU Disch–Falk Field • Austin, TX || W 4–0 || Henley (3–1) || Turski (1–3) || Ridgeway (3) || 5,142 || 11–9 || 2–0
|-bgcolor=ccffcc
| Mar 18 || Kansas ||  || UFCU Disch–Falk Field • Austin, TX || W 5–4 || Shugart (1–2) || Zeferjahn (3–1) || McGuire (1) || 4,649 || 12–9 || 3–0
|-bgcolor=ccffcc
| Mar 20 || * ||  || UFCU Disch–Falk Field • Austin, TX || W 3–2 || Bocchi (1–0) || Mikolajchak (2–3) || Kingham (2) || 4,394 || 13–9 || 
|-bgcolor=ffbbb
| Mar 23 ||  ||  || UFCU Disch–Falk Field • Austin, TX || L 1–6 || Lienhard (2–1) || Henley (3–2) || None || 4,983 || 13–10 || 3–1
|-bgcolor=ccffcc
| Mar 24 || Oklahoma State ||  || UFCU Disch–Falk Field • Austin, TX || W 7–1 || Kingham (4–2) || Heasley (2–2) || None || 5,646 || 14–10 || 4–1
|-bgcolor=ccffcc
| Mar 25 || Oklahoma State ||  || UFCU Disch–Falk Field • Austin, TX || W 10–5 || Elder (4–1) || Teel (3–1) || None || 5,049 || 15–10 || 5–1
|-bgcolor=ccffcc
| Mar 27 || at * ||  || Bobcat Ballpark • San Marcos, TX || W 6–1 || O'Donnell (2–1) || Engle (1–2) || None || 2,547 || 16–10 || 
|-bgcolor=ffbbb
| Mar 29 || at  ||  || Tointon Family Stadium • Manhattan, KS || L 2–5 || Ford (4–1) || Henley (3–3) || Eckberg (1) || 1,310 || 16–11 || 5–2
|-bgcolor=ffbbb
| Mar 30 || at Kansas State ||  || Tointon Family Stadium • Manhattan, KS || L 10–11 || Passino (1–0) || Ridgeway (1–2) || None || 1,979 || 16–12 || 5–3
|-bgcolor=ccffcc
| Mar 31 || at Kansas State ||  || Tointon Family Stadium • Manhattan, KS || W 9–5 || Shugart (2–2) || Heskett (2–3) || McGuire (2) || 1,479 || 17–12 || 6–3
|-

|-bgcolor=ccffcc
| Apr 2 || * ||  || UFCU Disch–Falk Field • Austin, TX || W 5–4 || Robinson (1–0) || Briggs (0–1) || McGuire (3) || 4,081 || 18–12 || 
|-bgcolor=ccffcc
| Apr 3 || at * ||  || Whataburger Field • Corpus Christi, TX || W 9–3 || Henley (4–3) || Perez (4–2) || None || 4,115 || 19–12 || 
|-bgcolor=ccffcc
| Apr 6 ||  ||  || UFCU Disch–Falk Field • Austin, TX || W 9–5 || Robinson (2–0) || Kettler (3–3) || Elder (1) || 5,391 || 20–12 || 7–3
|-bgcolor=ccffcc
| Apr 7 || Baylor ||  || UFCU Disch–Falk Field • Austin, TX || W 2–0 || Shugart (3–2) || Bradford (3–3) || McGuire (4) || 5,587 || 21–12 || 8–3
|-bgcolor=ccffcc
| Apr 8 || Baylor ||  || UFCU Disch–Falk Field • Austin, TX || W 4–1 || Henley (5–3) || Leckich (2–2) || Sawyer (1) || 5,125 || 22–12 || 9–3
|-bgcolor=ffbbb
| Apr 10 || at * ||  || Olsen Field at Blue Bell Park • College Station, TX || L 5–6 || Sherrod (2–1) || O'Donnell (2–2) || Hoffman (5) || 7,537 || 22–13 || 
|-bgcolor=ccffcc
| Apr 13 || at  ||  || L. Dale Mitchell Baseball Park • Norman, OK || W 7–6 || Bocchi (2–0) || Hansen (2–3) || McGuire (5) || 2,331 || 23–13 || 10–3
|-bgcolor=ccffcc
| Apr 14 || at Oklahoma ||  || L. Dale Mitchell Baseball Park • Norman, OK || W 5–3 || Kingman (5–2) || Prater (2–2) || None || 3,003 || 24–13 || 11–3
|-bgcolor=ffbbb
| Apr 15 || at Oklahoma ||  || L. Dale Mitchell Baseball Park • Norman, OK || L 0–6 || Wiles (3–2) || Henley (5–4) || None || 1,227 || 24–14 || 11–4
|-bgcolor=ccffcc
| Apr 17 || * ||  || UFCU Disch–Falk Field • Austin, TX || W 13–2 || Bocchi (3–0) || Quartier (0–1) || None || 4,250 || 25–14 || 
|-bgcolor=ccffcc
| Apr 18 || vs * ||  || Constellation Field • Sugar Land, TX || W 10–2 || O'Donnell (3–2) || Furlong (1–5) || None ||  || 26–14 || 
|-bgcolor=ccffcc
| Apr 20 || New Orleans* ||  || UFCU Disch–Falk Field • Austin, TX || W 8–6 || Sawyer (1–0) || Barr (4–3) || McGuire (6) || 4,953 || 27–14 || 
|-bgcolor=ccffcc
| Apr 21 || New Orleans* ||  || UFCU Disch–Falk Field • Austin, TX || W 3–1 || Shugart (4–2) || Smith (1–3) || Elder (2) || 5,203 || 28–14 || 
|-bgcolor=ffbbb
| Apr 22 || New Orleans* ||  || UFCU Disch–Falk Field • Austin, TX || L 1–4 || Stephens (3–3) || Henley (5–5) || Martin (6) || 5,300 || 28–15 || 
|-bgcolor=ccffcc
| Apr 24 || * ||  || UFCU Disch–Falk Field • Austin, TX || W 9–4 || Elder (5–1) || Lockhard (1–1) || None || 5,053 || 29–15 || 
|-bgcolor=ccffcc
| Apr 27 || at  ||  || Monongalia County Ballpark • Granville, WV || W 11–6 || Whelan (1–0) || Zarbinsky (2–3) || None || 1,812 || 30–15 || 12–4
|-bgcolor=ffbbb
| Apr 28 || at West Virginia ||  || Monongalia County Ballpark • Granville, WV || L 6–8 || Manoah (3–5) || McGuire (0–2) || None || 2,618 || 30–16 || 12–5
|-bgcolor=ffbbb
| Apr 29 || at West Virginia ||  || Monongalia County Ballpark • Granville, WV || L 3–8 || Kearns (3–1) || Henley (5–6) || None || 2,033 || 30–17 || 12–6
|-

|-bgcolor=ccffcc
| May 1 || Texas State* ||  || UFCU Disch–Falk Field • Austin, TX || W 11–10 || Fearon (1–0) || Theriot (1–3) || None || 4,696 || 31–17 || 
|-bgcolor=ccffcc
| May 4 || at Texas Tech ||  || Dan Law Field at Rip Griffin Park • Lubbock, TX || W 12–6 || Kingham (6–2) || Martin (6–4) || None || 4,432 || 32–17 || 13–6
|-bgcolor=ffbbb
| May 5 || at Texas Tech ||  || Dan Law Field at Rip Griffin Park • Lubbock, TX || L 5–16 || Kilian (8–1) || Shugart (4–3) || None || 4,432 || 32–18 || 13–7
|-bgcolor=ccffcc
| May 6 || at Texas Tech ||  || Dan Law Field at Rip Griffin Park • Lubbock, TX || W 7–5 || Robinson (3–0) || Harpenau (4–2) || McGuire (7) || 4,432 || 33–18 || 14–7
|-bgcolor=ccffcc
| May 15 || Texas State* ||  || UFCU Disch–Falk Field • Austin, TX || W 6–2 || Elder (6–1) || Baird (2–2) || None || 5,043 || 34–18 || 
|-bgcolor=ccffcc
| May 17 || TCU ||  || UFCU Disch–Falk Field • Austin, TX || W 3–2 || Kingham (7–2) || Lodolo (6–4) || None || 5,515 || 35–18 || 15–7
|-bgcolor=ccffcc
| May 18 || TCU ||  || UFCU Disch–Falk Field • Austin, TX || W 5–3 || McGuire (1–2) || Mihlbauer (1–1) || None || 6,779 || 36–18 || 16–7
|-bgcolor=ccffcc
| May 19 || TCU ||  || UFCU Disch–Falk Field • Austin, TX || W 7–3 || Fields (1–0) || Green (2–2) || None || 7,294 || 37–18 || 17–7
|-

|-
! style=""|Postseason
|- valign="top" 

|-bgcolor=ffbbb
| May 23 || Kansas ||  || Chickasaw Bricktown Ballpark • Oklahoma City, OK || L 2–3 || Goddard (5–1) || Bocchi (3–1) || Cyr (1) || 4,208 || 37–19 || 0–1
|-bgcolor=ffbbb
| May 24 || Oklahoma ||  || Chickasaw Bricktown Ballpark • Oklahoma City, OK || L 1–3 || Prater (3–3) || Kingham (7–3) || Hansen (7) || 3,803 || 37–20 || 0–2
|-

|-bgcolor=ccffcc
| June 1 || Texas Southern ||  || UFCU Disch–Falk Field • Austin, TX || W 10–0 || Shugart (5–3) || Schneider (4–7) || Bocchi (1) || 6,914 || 38–20 || 1–0
|-bgcolor=ccffcc
| June 2 || Texas A&M ||  || UFCU Disch–Falk Field • Austin, TX || W 8–3 || Kingham (8–3) || Kilkenny (8–5) || None || 7,046 || 39–20 || 2–0
|-bgcolor=ccffcc
| June 3 || Indiana ||  || UFCU Disch–Falk Field • Austin, TX || W 3–2 || Henley (6–6) || Sommer (2–1) || Shugart (2) || 6,855 || 40–20 || 3–0
|-

|-bgcolor=ffbbb
| June 9 ||  ||  || UFCU Disch–Falk Field • Austin, TX || L 4–5 || Evey (8–0) || Kingham (8–4) || Roberts (15) || 7,062 || 40–21 || 0–1
|-bgcolor=ccffcc
| June 10 || Tennessee Tech ||  || UFCU Disch–Falk Field • Austin, TX || W 4–2 || Shugart (6–3) || Moths (13–3) || Henley (1) || 7,151 || 41–21 || 1–1
|-bgcolor=ccffcc
| June 11 || Tennessee Tech ||  || UFCU Disch–Falk Field • Austin, TX || W 5–2 || Bocchi (4–1) || Hursey (8–5) || Kingham (3) || 7,370 || 42–21 || 2–1
|-

|-bgcolor=ffbbb
| June 17  || Arkansas || || TD Ameritrade Park • Omaha, NE || L 5–11 || Knight (13-0) || Kingham (8-5) |||  || 23,034 || 42–22 || 0–1
|-bgcolor=ffbbb
| June 19  || Florida || || TD Ameritrade Park • Omaha, NE || L 1–6  || Kowar (10-5)  || Henley (6-7) |||  || 16,620 || 42–23 || 0–2
|-

Rankings

References

Texas Longhorns
2018
Texas Longhorns baseball
Big 12 Conference baseball champion seasons
2018 NCAA Division I baseball tournament participants
College World Series seasons